Cowboy beans (also known as chuckwagon beans) is a bean dish popular in the southwestern United States.  The dish consists of pinto beans and ground beef in a sweet and tangy sauce. Other types of meat can be used. The flavor is similar to baked beans but with a southwestern twist.  Although cowboy appears in the name, the use of canned beans, ketchup, and barbecue sauce means the dish is unlike anything ranch hands would have eaten in the 19th century. Cowboy beans are served stewed or baked, depending on the recipe.

It is unclear how cowboy beans got their name or where they originated. They are easy to prepare and variations on the recipe are available on the Internet and in cookbooks and cooking magazines.   Cowboy beans use many of the same ingredients as chili con carne with a very different taste.

Cowboy beans is a staple food in Texas.

Ingredients

A typical recipe might include:

 Pork and beans
 Ground beef
 Onion powder
 Black pepper
 Ketchup
 Barbecue sauce
 Brown sugar
 Milk
 Flour

See also
 Borracho beans
 Frijoles charros, a Mexican dish, sometimes translated as cowboy beans.
 Texas caviar, sometimes called "cowboy caviar"
 List of legume dishes

References

External links
Cowboy Beans with Bacon Recipe
A typical Cowboy Bean recipe

Beef dishes
Baked foods
American legume dishes